MS National Geographic Endeavour was a small expedition ship operated by Lindblad Expeditions for cruising in remote areas, particularly the polar regions.

History 

The ship was originally a fishing trawler built in 1966 as Marburg, and converted to carry passengers in 1983. First named North Star, then Caledonian Star; she received her present name in June 2001.

On March 2, 2001, the ship was struck by a 30-metre-high rogue wave while crossing the Drake Passage. The wave smashed the windows of the bridge and ruined the navigation and communications equipment, but did not cripple the ship. She was assisted by the Argentine Navy ocean fleet tug ARA Alferez Sobral and reached Ushuaia three days later.

When National Geographic Endeavour was retired, the piano was donated to the Tomas de Berlanga school in Santa Cruz, Galapagos. The bridge ceiling, notched with polar bear sightings from her time in Svalbard, is with Sven Lindblad. The model, valuable art and other mementos were saved. Some items were transferred to National Geographic Endeavour II.

National Geographic Endeavour was scrapped on 6 May 2017.

References

External links 
 Details of the ship

Ships built in Bremen (state)
Rogue wave incidents
1966 ships
Maritime incidents in 2001
Ships of Lindblad Expeditions